This is a list of the gymnasts who represented their country at the 2012 Summer Olympics in London from 27 July to 12 August 2012. Gymnasts across three disciplines (artistic gymnastics, rhythmic gymnastics, and trampoline) participated in the Games.

Women's artistic gymnastics

Men's artistic gymnastics

Rhythmic gymnasts

Individual

Group

Male trampoline gymnasts

Female trampoline gymnasts

References 

Lists of gymnasts
Gymnastics at the 2012 Summer Olympics